All Night Cinema is the third album from British electronic music artist Just Jack. The lead single "Embers" was released in March 2009 and reached #17 on the UK Singles Chart. The second single was set to be Doctor Doctor but despite a video being made and receiving over 15,000 views, the song only got minor airplay by XFM. Due to this the second single was "The Day I Died", released on 17 August, which surpassed "Embers" and reached #11 on the same chart. The album was released on 31 August 2009, reaching #22 on the UK album charts.

Track listing
 "Embers" – 3:26
 "253" – 3:59
 "The Day I Died" – 3:35
 "Doctor Doctor" – 3:34
 "So Wrong" – 3:19
 "Blood" – 3:35
 "All Night Cinema" – 5:06
 "Astronaut" 3:44
 "Goth in the Disco" – 3:55
 "Lo and Behold" – 2:51
 "Basement" – 4:17

References 

Just Jack albums
2009 albums